is a Japanese rugby union player who plays as a Fullback.

References

1994 births
Living people
Rugby union fullbacks
Sunwolves players
Japanese rugby union players
Rugby union centres
Saitama Wild Knights players
Tokyo Sungoliath players
21st-century Japanese people